Events from the year 1802 in Sweden

Incumbents
 Monarch – Gustav IV Adolf

Events

 10 July - The British occupation of the Swedish colony of Saint Barthélemy discontinues.
 - Tantalum discovered by Anders Gustaf Ekeberg.
 - The foundation of the Yellow Rose (society).
 - The Cause célèbre of Metta Fock.

Births

 25 March - Maria Silfvan, actress (died 1865)
 - Emma Fürstenhoff, florist  (died 1871)

Deaths

 9 October - Ebba Morman, actress (born 1769)
 - Adolf Ludvig Hamilton, politician, memoir writer  (born 1747)

References

 
Years of the 19th century in Sweden